Baiima is a small town in Bo District in the Southern Province of Sierra Leone. As of 2009 it had an estimated population of 4,116.

It is served by a railway station

References

Populated places in Sierra Leone